The 51st parallel north is a circle of latitude that is 51 degrees north of the Earth's equatorial plane. It crosses Europe, Asia, the Pacific Ocean, North America, and the Atlantic Ocean.

At this latitude the sun is visible for 16 hours, 33 minutes during the summer solstice and 7 hours, 55 minutes during the winter solstice.

Capital cities between the 51st and 52nd parallels are London and Astana.

Around the world 
Starting at the Prime Meridian (just north of the Sheffield Park Garden in East Sussex, England) and heading eastwards, the parallel 51° north passes through:

{| class="wikitable plainrowheaders"
! scope="col" width="125" | Co-ordinates
! scope="col" | Country, territory or sea
! scope="col" | Notes
|-
| 
! scope="row" | 
| England: East Sussex, Kent (just south of Dover)
|-
| style="background:#b0e0e6;" | 
! scope="row" style="background:#b0e0e6;" | Strait of Dover
| style="background:#b0e0e6;" |
|-valign="top"
| 
! scope="row" | 
| Nord-Pas-de-Calais — passing just south of Dunkirk and the northernmost point of France
|-
| 
! scope="row" | 
| Passing all 5 provinces of Flanders
|-
| 
! scope="row" | 
| Limburg — for about  — passing through Sittard
|-valign="top"
| 
! scope="row" | 
| North Rhine-Westphalia — passing through northern Cologne Hesse Thuringia — passing through Erfurt Saxony-Anhalt Thuringia Saxony — passing just south of Dresden
|-
| 
! scope="row" | 
|
|-
| 
! scope="row" | 
| Saxony
|-
| 
! scope="row" | 
| For about 
|-
| 
! scope="row" | 
|
|-
| 
! scope="row" | 
| For about 
|-
| 
! scope="row" | 
| For about 
|-
| 
! scope="row" | 
| Passing just south of Wrocław
|-
| 
! scope="row" | 
| Volyn oblast — passing just north of LutskRivne OblastZhytomyr Oblast — passing just north of KorostenKyiv Oblast — passing through Kiev ReservoirChernihiv Oblast — passing just south of NizhynSumy Oblast — passing just north of Sumy
|-
| 
! scope="row" | 
|
|-
| 
! scope="row" | 
|
|-
| 
! scope="row" | 
|
|-
| 
! scope="row" | 
| For about 
|-
| 
! scope="row" | 
| For about 
|-
| 
! scope="row" | 
|
|-
| 
! scope="row" | 
|
|-
| 
! scope="row" | 
|
|-
| 
! scope="row" | 
|
|-
| 
! scope="row" | 
|
|-
| 
! scope="row" | 
|
|-
| 
! scope="row" | 
|
|-
| 
! scope="row" | 
|
|-
| 
! scope="row" | 
| For about 
|-
| 
! scope="row" | 
| For about 
|-
| 
! scope="row" | 
| For about 
|-
| 
! scope="row" | 
|
|-
| 
! scope="row" | 
|
|-
| 
! scope="row" | 
|
|-valign="top"
| 
! scope="row" | 
| Inner Mongolia  Heilongjiang
|-
| 
! scope="row" | 
|
|-
| style="background:#b0e0e6;" | 
! scope="row" style="background:#b0e0e6;" | Strait of Tartary
| style="background:#b0e0e6;" |
|-
| 
! scope="row" | 
| Island of Sakhalin
|-
| style="background:#b0e0e6;" | 
! scope="row" style="background:#b0e0e6;" | Sea of Okhotsk
| style="background:#b0e0e6;" |
|-
| 
! scope="row" | 
| Kamchatka Peninsula
|-valign="top"
| style="background:#b0e0e6;" | 
! scope="row" style="background:#b0e0e6;" | Pacific Ocean
| style="background:#b0e0e6;" | Passing just south of Amatignak Island, Alaska,  Passing just north of Vancouver Island, British Columbia, 
|-valign="top"
| 
! scope="row" | 
| British Columbia — passing through city of Revelstoke Alberta — passing through city of Calgary Saskatchewan Manitoba - passing just south of the city of Dauphin Ontario - passing just south of the town of Red Lake Passing just south of the tip of James Bay Quebec
|-
| style="background:#b0e0e6;" | 
! scope="row" style="background:#b0e0e6;" | Gulf of Saint Lawrence
| style="background:#b0e0e6;" |
|-
| 
! scope="row" | 
| Newfoundland and Labrador — island of Newfoundland
|-valign="top"
| style="background:#b0e0e6;" | 
! scope="row" style="background:#b0e0e6;" | Atlantic Ocean
| style="background:#b0e0e6;" | Passing just north of Groais Island, Newfoundland and Labrador, 
|-
| 
! scope="row" | 
| England — Devon, Dorset, Wiltshire, Hampshire (passing just north of Southampton), West Sussex, East Sussex
|-
|}

Russian America 1799–1824/25
In 1799 Paul I, Tsar of the Russian Empire, issued a ukase creating the Russian-American Company (RAC). It was granted monopolistic control north of the 55th parallel north, which had been the Russian claim since 1790, as well as the right to operate and occupy territory to the south as long as the lands had not been previously occupied, or dependent on any other nation. In 1821 the RAC's charter was renewed and at the same time an ukase proclaimed that Russian sovereignty extended south to the 51st parallel, and that waters north of that line were closed to foreign shipping. The ukase was met with strong objections by the United States and Great Britain. Subsequent negotiations resulted in a clear and permanent boundary for Russian America, the southward terminus of which was established at 54°40′ north.

See also
50th parallel north
52nd parallel north

References

n51